Andrew Brace is a rugby union referee and former player. Born in Cardiff, Wales, Brace represents the Irish Rugby Football Union as a referee, and was an international player for Belgium. He has refereed matches in the Pro14, the European Rugby Challenge Cup and the European Rugby Champions Cup. In 2017 he began refereeing test matches.

Early life
Brace was born in Cardiff, Wales. He moved between Ireland and Wales throughout his early life. He started playing rugby union in Cardiff when he was 12. In his youth Brace also played the violin. He is a grade eight violinist. His violin teacher was the mother of Gethin Jones. Between 2006 and 2009 Brace attended the University of St Mark & St John where he gained a BA in sports science and coaching. Between 2010 and 2017 Brace worked as a community rugby officer for Munster Rugby. He previously worked as a community development officer for Cardiff Blues. Brace continued working as a community rugby officer until 2017 when, together with  George Clancy, John Lacey and  Joy Neville he was one of seven referees offered professional contracts by the IRFU.

Playing career

Clubs
While working as a community rugby officer for Munster Rugby, Brace also played for Old Crescent.

Belgium
While playing for Old Crescent, Brace was contacted by an agent to play for the Belgium national team. Brace qualified to represent Belgium through his father's family. He subsequently helped Belgium win the 2012 Emirates Cup of Nations. He also played for Belgium in the 2012–14 European Nations Cup First Division. His international career ended after he suffered a run of injuries. Brace also played for the Belgium sevens team.

Refereeing career

Early years
While still working as a community rugby officer for Munster Rugby, Brace attended a  schools tournament and was asked to referee a match because they were short of an official. The match was between Abbey CBS and St Mary's Town School. He was encouraged to take up refereeing by John Lacey. Brace subsequently took charge of matches in both the British and Irish Cup and All-Ireland League. On 3 April 2015 he refereed the 2014–15 British and Irish Cup final between Worcester Warriors and Doncaster Knights. On 7 May 2016 he refereed the 2015–16 All-Ireland League final between Clontarf and Cork Constitution. On 6 September 2015 Brace made his Pro14 debut when he took charge of a 2015–16 match between Cardiff Blues and Zebre.

European competitions
On 14 November 2015 Brace made his European Rugby Challenge Cup debut, taking charge of a 2015–16 pool stage match between Gloucester and Zebre. 
On 15 October 2016 Brace made his European Rugby Champions Cup debut, taking charge of a 2016–17 pool stage match between Wasps and Zebre. On 22 April 2017 Brace took charge of the 2016–17 European Rugby Challenge Cup semi-final between La Rochelle and Gloucester.

International 
Brace refereed matches in the 2016 Six Nations Under 20s Championship and at the 2016 World Rugby Under 20 Championship, including the third place game between Argentina and South Africa.

In 2017 Brace began refereeing test matches. On 28 May 2017 Brace took charge of a match between England and the Barbarians and on 10 June 2017 he took charge of a match between Canada and Georgia. On 1 July 2017 Brace took charge of his first competitive test match, a 2019 Rugby World Cup qualifier between Canada and the United States.  In addition to taking charge of test matches, Brace has also served as a touch judge/assistant referee in both the Six Nations Championship and the Rugby Championship. He was appointed to the 2019 Rugby World Cup as a touch judge. He will referee two matches in the 2021 Six Nations Championship.

Honours
Belgium
Emirates Cup of Nations
Winners: 2012
Individual
Munster Rugby Referee of the Year
 2014

Pro14 Final Referee 2020

European Challenge Cup Final Referee 2020,2021

Autumn Nations Cup Final Referee 2020

Notes

References

Living people
1988 births
Belgian rugby union players
Belgium international rugby union players
Welsh rugby union players
Welsh rugby sevens players
Welsh rugby union referees
Expatriate rugby union players in Ireland
IRFU referees
European Rugby Champions Cup referees
EPCR Challenge Cup referees
United Rugby Championship referees
Rugby union players from Cardiff
Alumni of Plymouth Marjon University
Welsh violinists
21st-century violinists